A. Damien Martin (December 1933 – August 15, 1991) was one of the founders of the Hetrick-Martin Institute (HMI), originally known as the Institute for the Protection of Lesbian and Gay Youth (IPLGY), which in turn founded the Harvey Milk High School in New York City.  Martin taught speech pathology at the NYU School of Education.

Martin was a member of the Governor’s Task Force on Teenage Suicide, Child Welfare League of America, The New York City Task Force on AIDS, and the NYC Board of Education Multicultural Advisory Committee.

Personal life
Martin and Emery Hetrick were partners at HMI and life partners. They were together since 1975, lived together in Manhattan’s Upper East Side and are buried next to each other in Brooklyn at the Green-Wood Cemetery.

Martin was born in December, 1933 in Philadelphia. He died August 15, 1991 at his home in New York City of AIDS related complications at the age of 57.

Honors and awards
Both Martin and Hetrick were named Icons for LGBT History Month.

References 

1933 births
1991 deaths
20th-century LGBT people
AIDS-related deaths in New York (state)
Burials at Green-Wood Cemetery
LGBT educators
People from Philadelphia
People from the Upper East Side
Steinhardt School of Culture, Education, and Human Development faculty